Saint Maria Goretti Catholic High School is a private, Roman Catholic day school located in Hagerstown, Maryland. It is located in the Roman Catholic Archdiocese of Baltimore, within the tri-state areas of the Eastern Panhandle of West Virginia, Western Maryland, and Southern Pennsylvania.

History 
The school was originally the upper school for St. Mary's Catholic School, currently a K-8 day school located in downtown Hagerstown. From 1933 to 1955 the school was known as St. Mary's High School. In 1957, the upper school was relocated to a new campus in Hagerstown's North End and was renamed St. Maria Goretti High School in honor of the Italian saint Maria Goretti, who "lost her life at the age of 11 in order to protect her purity". The campus sits adjacent to St. Ann Roman Catholic Church.

For much of the school's history, its faculty and administration was composed partly of members of the School Sisters of Notre Dame. However, in the 1980s and 1990s the high school grew increasingly reliant on lay faculty. Currently, the faculty and administration are entirely from the laity, though the school continues to have a chaplain. Goretti has approximately 225 pupils.

Athletics 

St. Maria Goretti is a member of the Baltimore Catholic League in basketball, and a member of the Crossroad Lacrosse League and Metro Independent Lacrosse League in lacrosse. In men's soccer, the school won championships in 2003, 2005, 2008, and 2010. The school also competes in swimming.

Notable alumni
 John P. Donoghue, member of Maryland House of Delegates
 Rodney Monroe, former ACC Player of the Year, basketball, NC State University
Kelly Wright, former Fox News anchor and national recording artist
 Trey Boothe, college lacrosse player

See also

National Catholic Educational Association

Notes and references

External links
 
 

Christianity in Hagerstown, Maryland
Catholic secondary schools in Maryland
Schools in Hagerstown, Maryland
Educational institutions established in 1933
1933 establishments in Maryland